Jennifer Doleac is an American economist who will become vice president of criminal justice at Arnold Ventures mid-2023. She was previously an associate professor at Texas A&M, where she directed the Justice Tech Lab, was a research affiliate of the University of Chicago Crime Lab, and serves on the board of editors of he Journal of Economic Literature. She also hosts the Probable Causation podcast. In October 2022, Vox named her to their "Future Perfect 50," a list of "scientists, thinkers, scholars, writers, and activists building a more perfect future," writing, "Doleac looks at criminal justice policy through the lens of causal factors on a society-wide level."

Education and career 
Doleac received her B.A. in Economics and Mathematics from Williams College in 2003. She completed her PhD in economics from Stanford University in 2012 and was on the faculty of the University of Virginia Batten School of Leadership and Public Policy from 2012 to 2018. She was a visiting fellow at the Brookings Institution in 2015-2016 and then a Nonresident Fellow in Economic Studies. She moved to Texas A&M Department of Economics as an associate professor with tenure in 2018. In 2021, Texas A&M named her one of 20 Presidential Impact Fellows at that university.

Career 
Doleac's research focuses on the economics of crime and discrimination, with particular interests in prisoner reentry and on policies that affect public safety. In work receiving media attention, she has studied the impact of policies banning employers from asking about job applicants' prior criminal records, the impact of daylight saving time on crime, and the impact of prosecuting non-violent misdemeanor offenses.

Research on ban-the-box initiatives 
Doleac has written extensively prisoner reentry.  Prisoner reentry is a considerable challenge in the United States due to the ubiquity of background checks and the myriad of obstacles prisoners face reentering the labor force upon release.  An increasingly popular policy at the federal, state and municipality level is the "ban the box" initiative.  Employers often will ask applicants for jobs if they have any prior arrests or convictions by checking Yes or No on a "box".  The ban the box initiative are laws, oftentimes at the city level, banning employers' right to ask this information of applicants during the earliest stages of the application process.  In her most-cited publication, a 2018 article published in the Journal of Labor Economics, Doleac and Benjamin Hansen from the University of Oregon found that these laws had unintended consequences on the hiring of low skill minorities.  The authors found that ban the box policies lowered the chances of employment by 5 percent for young, low-skilled black men and almost 3 percent for young, low-skilled Hispanic men. The authors argue that this effect was caused by rampant statistical discrimination in labor markets.  Without information on a candidate's criminal history, employers make extreme racially biased assumptions that the applicant is similar to his or her demographic.  Thus seeing a black applicant, even one without a criminal history, the firm "fills in" the missing information by assuming he or she is like the group average, and thus is more likely to believe the applicant has a criminal history, even when they do not.

Selected research publications 
 Doleac, Jennifer L., and Benjamin Hansen. "The unintended consequences of “ban the box”: Statistical discrimination and employment outcomes when criminal histories are hidden." Journal of Labor Economics 38, no. 2 (2020): 321-374.
 Doleac, Jennifer L., and Luke CD Stein. "The visible hand: Race and online market outcomes." The Economic Journal 123, no. 572 (2013): F469-F492.
 Doleac, Jennifer L., and Nicholas J. Sanders. "Under the cover of darkness: How ambient light influences criminal activity." Review of Economics and Statistics 97, no. 5 (2015): 1093-1103.
 Doleac, Jennifer L. "The effects of DNA databases on crime." American Economic Journal: Applied Economics 9, no. 1 (2017): 165-201.
 Doleac, Jennifer L., and Anita Mukherjee. "The effects of naloxone access laws on opioid abuse, mortality, and crime." The Journal of Law and Economics 65, no. 2 (2022): 211-238.

Public Impact 
In addition to conducting her own research, Doleac synthesizes and critiques other studies of crime and criminology, highlighting results supported by solid empirical work and by natural experiments that support causal relationships. She has testified about the impact of Ban-the-box policies on hiring before the U.S. House Committee on Oversight and Government Reform and about effective crime-reduction policies before the New Mexico Legislature.

Podcast 
Doleac hosts the Probable Causation podcast focusing on law, economics and crime.
Probable Causation podcast

Harm reduction 
In 2018, Doleac, then a Brookings expert, released a study under Brookings along with Anita Mukherjee and Molly Schnell which claimed that harm reduction  (prescribing heroin for opioid addiction) does not work. Doleac and her co-authors claimed that syringe exchange programs and naloxone distribution would worsen addiction. However, the claims were disputed by public health officials who argued that the results of Doleac's finding go against previous research on harm reduction. Doleac and her co-authors, it was claimed, only focused on economic literature on harm reduction and ignored public health research. In response to the criticism, Doleac released a statement through Brookings where she said the public health discipline was filled with researchers who  "collectively have so little understanding of rigorous research methods". In response to Doleac's comments, Brookings released a statement where the institute said that it "does not take positions on issues, nor does [it] endorse Doleac's response to the criticism and feedback she received".

External links
Economist Jennifer Doleac of Texas A&M University talks with EconTalk host Russ Roberts about her research on crime, police, and the unexpected consequences of the criminal justice system.

References 

21st-century American economists
Williams College alumni
Stanford University alumni
Texas A&M University faculty
Living people
Year of birth missing (living people)
American women economists
21st-century American women